The Queer Liberation March is an annual LGBT protest march in Manhattan, organized by the Reclaim Pride Coalition as an anti-corporate alternative to the NYC Pride March.

A grassroots collective of queer rights activists and supporters held the first Queer Liberation March to coincide with WorldPride NYC, which marked the 50th anniversary of the Stonewall riots. A year later the coalition marched in solidarity with Black Lives Matter, and against police brutality, only to see the non-violent demonstration met with NYPD using pepper spray on protesters.

Background 
There has been a large annual march and parade in New York City since 1970, first organized by the Christopher Street Liberation Day Committee, to mark the one-year anniversary of the Stonewall Riots. Since 1984, the growing event was produced by the nonprofit Heritage of Pride. Criticism of the increasingly corporate and rules-heavy event reached a tipping point in 1994 (the 25th anniversary of the Stonewall riots), resulting in the first Drag March. The Queer Liberation March was organized in protest of the corporate-focused sponsorship and participation requirements of the larger march, resulting in dueling Manhattan LGBT marches on the same day in 2019. The Queer Liberation March proceeded uptown on Sixth Avenue in Manhattan, following the path of the original 1970 demonstration. As a result of following the 1970 route, the first Queer Liberation March proceeded in the opposite direction of the New York City Pride March, which travels downtown on Fifth Avenue through most of its route.

Organization 
The Queer Liberation March was organized by the Reclaim Pride Coalition and was endorsed by activist and grassroots organizations including ACT UP NY, God's Love We Deliver, Housing Works, NYC Democratic Socialists of America, and SAGE. Civil rights attorney Norman Siegel worked with the City of New York for an agreement to hold the march on the same day as the larger NYC Pride March.

The march sought to embrace the activist intentions some believe have been lost in the larger, celebratory event.

Participation 
The 2019 march began with 8,000 participants at the Stonewall National Monument and grew to 45,000 people as others joined along the way.

Special themes
 2020: Queer Liberation March for Black Lives and Against Police Brutality
 2022: Queer Liberation March for Trans and BIPOC Freedom, Reproductive Justice, and Bodily Autonomy

See also 
 Critical pride
 LGBT culture in New York City
 Night pride
 Pink capitalism

References 

LGBT culture in New York City
LGBT events in New York (state)
Pride parades in the United States
LGBT civil rights demonstrations